The Krishna Institute of Medical Sciences is an Indian hospital chain based in Telangana. It was founded by Dr. Bhaskar Rao Bollineni in 2000 in the city of Nellore.  Currently, the KIMS Group operates 13 hospitals across the states of Andhra Pradesh, Telangana and Maharashtra. The KIMS Hospital Group is certified by NABH and NABL. It is listed on BSE and the NSE.

History 
The oldest hospital from the KIMS Group was founded in 2000 at Nellore, by Dr. Bhaskar Rao Bollineni, a cardiac surgeon, who has performed over 30,000 surgeries. Shortly after, in 2002, he started another hospital in Rajahmundry in 2002. In 2004, KIMS group's flagship hospital, KIMS Secunderabad hospital was established, which is now a 1000-bedded hospital. Over the course of the next decade, the group expanded to several other cities in Andhra Pradesh and Maharashtra, having a total capacity of 4000 beds.

In 2015, KIMS Hospital received the first Green Operation Theater certification in Andhra Pradesh, and Telangana. KIMS Hospital was awarded an ‘Association of Health Care Providers India (AHPI) Award 2017’ in the Patient Friendly Hospital category, for Telangana region in 2017. Dr Bhaskar Rao's son Abhinay Bollineni is currently the CEO of KIMS Hospitals.

In 2021, Krishna Institute of Medical Sciences launched its initial public offering (IPO) and became a public company.

Branches

The KIMS Group has hospitals in Secunderabad, Hyderabad,
Visakhapatnam,  Nagpur, Kondapur, Ongole, Rajahmundry, Srikakulam, Nellore, Anantapur and Kurnool.

KIMS Secunderabad

KIMS Secunderabad is the headquarters of the KIMS Group and was established in 2004. This hospital won the Best Multi Specialty Hospital Award at the Indo-Global Healthcare Summit & Expo 2015 and in 2016 received the Pharmacie De Qualite certification from Bureau Veritas. Heart surgeons at this hospital conducted a complex heart surgery on a 11-month-old baby from Zimbabwe.

KIMS Kondapur

KIMS Kondapur is a multi-speciality hospital which has cardiology, orthopedics, gastroenterology, nephrology, oncology, anaesthesiology, accidents; emergency care, endocrinology; diabetology and neurological sciences.

KIMS Anantapur
KIMS-Saveera Hospital in Anantapur is the largest healthcare facility in the Rayalaseema region. The group also opened an emergency clinic in Anantapur in 2019.

KIMS Vizag
In 2018, KIMS opened a multi-speciality hospital in Vizag. Doctors in this hospital removed a coin stuck in a man's lungs for 30 years.

KIMS Ongole
The KIMS Group opened a multi-speciality hospital in Ongole in 2017. In 2018, the hospital announced that they performed more than 1000 surgeries in one year of operation.

Services 
KIMS Hospitals offers services in Cardiology, Cardiothoracic and Cardiovascular surgery, Dermatology, Dental, Diabetology, ENT, Gastroenterology, Oncology, Nephrology, Neurology, Neurosurgery, Obstetrics & Gynecology, Organ Transplantation, Orthopedics, Pediatrics, Pulmonology, Plastic Surgery, Rheumatology, Robotics and Urology.

Organ transplantation

KIMS Hospital has infrastructure to support organ transplantation and created an organ donation swap registry. In 2019, KIMS Secunderabad recorded 1,000 kidney transplant surgeries, In a first of its kind procedure in India, KIMS Hospitals Lung Transplant Doctors successfully performed a double lung transplant surgery on a Covid-19 patient.

The KIMS Heart and Lung Transplant team has performed 12 Covid Double Lung transplants and overall 50 Lung and Heart transplant procedures between September 2020 and April 2021.

This is by far the highest number of procedures performed at a single healthcare institute in Asia in the past eight months as far as COVID Double Lung Transplants are concerned.

Robotic surgeries
KIMS Group of Hospitals are one of the first few hospitals in India to focus on robotic surgeries and they setup South India's first robotic facility. In 2011, they performed the first robot-assisted colorectal surgery in India. The hospital performs robotic surgeries for oncology, gynaecology, urology and gastroentrology.

Programs
In 2017, the cardiology department held the 13th annual Cardiology Update programme. 
In 2019, the orthopaedic department held a course on knee replacement for orthopaedic surgeons across Andhra Pradesh and Telangana. The hospital also conducted a Lupus Awareness Ramp Walk and Deep Vein Thrombosis Awareness Walk in 2019. In 2019, they also held a conference on bone marrow transplant in paediatrics.

Awards

References

External links

Hospital networks in India
Companies based in Hyderabad, India
Health care companies of India
2000 establishments in Andhra Pradesh
Indian companies established in 2000
Companies listed on the National Stock Exchange of India
Companies listed on the Bombay Stock Exchange